Suavocallia splendens is a species of land snail with an operculum, a terrestrial gastropod mollusk in the family Pupinidae. This species is endemic to Australia.

References

Gastropods of Australia
Suavocallia
Vulnerable fauna of Australia
Taxonomy articles created by Polbot